Gari is a rural locality (a village) in Pertsevskoye Rural Settlement, Gryazovetsky District, Vologda Oblast, Russia. The population was 39 as of 2002.

Geography 
Gari is located 12 km northwest of Gryazovets (the district's administrative centre) by road. Knyazevo is the nearest rural locality.

References 

Rural localities in Gryazovetsky District